Eugenia Miron (born 25 November 1992) is a Russian-born Moldovan footballer who plays as a midfielder and has appeared for the Moldova women's national team.

Career
Miron has been capped for the Moldova national team, appearing for the team during the 2019 FIFA Women's World Cup qualifying cycle.

See also
List of Moldova women's international footballers

References

External links
 
 
 

1992 births
Living people
Women's association football midfielders
Moldovan women's footballers
Moldova women's international footballers
Russian women's footballers
FC Noroc Nimoreni players